Simon Duggan,  (born 13 May 1959) is a New Zealand-born Australian cinematographer.

Career 
Duggan started his career off in Australia at Ross Wood Film Studios. His first feature film was 1998's The Interview starring Hugo Weaving. Duggan frequently worked with Alex Proyas and Len Wiseman, acting as cinematographer on their films Garage Days, I, Robot, Underworld: Evolution, Live Free or Die Hard and Knowing. Other credits include The Mummy: Tomb of the Dragon Emperor and Killer Elite.

Duggan was director of photography on Baz Luhrmann's The Great Gatsby. This was Luhrmann's first experience filming with 3D.

After The Great Gatsby, Duggan worked on 300: Rise of an Empire, Duncan Jones' Warcraft, and Hacksaw Ridge, which marked Mel Gibson's return to directing after 2006's Apocalypto.

Duggan was invited as a member to the Australian Cinematographers Society in 1989, and American Society of Cinematographers in 2022.

Filmography

References

External links 
 

1959 births
Australian cinematographers
Living people
New Zealand expatriates in Australia